Johnson Creek, originally known as Cottonwood Creek, is a stream in iron County, Utah, United States.

History
The Mormon Waybill an 1851 guide to the Mormon Road says that the campsite at Cottonwood Creek, has, "... good feed and water."
  The water of the creek was provided by the springs at the head of the stream, named for Joel H. Johnson, a Mormon, the earliest known settler at that location, in 1851.  In 1854, other Mormon colonists settled along the creek and built a settlement nearby at  called Fort Johnson.

References

Rivers of Utah
Rivers of the Great Basin
Mormon Road
Rivers of Iron County, Utah